Roger Closset (11 February 1933 – 27 October 2020) was a French fencer. He won a silver medal in the team foil event at the 1956 Summer Olympics.

References

External links
 

1933 births
2020 deaths
French male foil fencers
Olympic fencers of France
Fencers at the 1956 Summer Olympics
Fencers at the 1960 Summer Olympics
Olympic silver medalists for France
Olympic medalists in fencing
Fencers from Paris
Medalists at the 1956 Summer Olympics
20th-century French people